Haworthia parksiana is a species of succulent plant native to the Western Cape of South Africa. Regarded as the smallest and one of the rarest types of Haworthia in the wild, it is thought to be most closely related to Haworthia floribunda.

References

External links

Flora of South Africa
parksiana
Plants described in 1937